This is a list of Swedish indie pop artists who have either been important to the genre or have had a considerable amount of exposure (such as in the case of one that has been on a major label). This list does not include little-known local bands. Bands are listed by the first letter in their name (not including the words "a", "an", or "the"), and individuals are listed by last name.

List of notable Swedish indie pop artists

Acid House Kings
Amber Oak
Billie the Vision and the Dancers
bob hund
ceo
The Concretes
Cinnamon
club 8
Badlands (Swedish musical act)
Broder Daniel
Dungen
Easy
Eggstone
El Perro del Mar
Fever Ray
First Aid Kit
Friska Viljor
José González
Hearts of Black Science
Helena Josefsson
Hello Saferide
I'm from Barcelona
Jonathan Johansson
jj
The Knife
Komeda
Jens Lekman
Le Pamplemoüse
Loney, Dear
Love Is All
Lykke Li
Maia Hirasawa
Marching Band
Melody Club
Miike Snow
Niki and the Dove
NONONO
Stina Nordenstam
Oh Laura
Pacific!
Peter Bjorn & John
Principe Valiente
Popsicle
Raymond & Maria
The Radio Dept.
Sandy Mouche
Shout Out Louds
Gustaf Spetz
The Royal Concept
The Sounds
Suburban Kids with Biblical Names
Taken By Trees
The Tallest Man on Earth
The Tough Alliance
Peter von Poehl
Jenny Wilson
The Wannadies
Urban Cone

 
Indie pop artists